Robert Edward Pye (born February 13, 1967) is a former Major League Baseball infielder.  He is an alumnus of Middle Tennessee State University.

Drafted by the Los Angeles Dodgers in the 10th round of the 1988 MLB amateur draft, Pye made his Major League Baseball debut with the Los Angeles Dodgers on June 3, 1994, and appeared in his final game on May 19, 1995.

External links

Baseball players from Tennessee
People from Columbia, Tennessee
1967 births
Living people
Middle Tennessee State University alumni
Los Angeles Dodgers players
Major League Baseball second basemen
Major League Baseball third basemen
Major League Baseball shortstops
Middle Tennessee Blue Raiders baseball players
Great Falls Dodgers players
Bakersfield Dodgers players
San Antonio Missions players
Albuquerque Dukes players
Tucson Toros players
Norfolk Tides players
African-American baseball players
21st-century African-American people
20th-century African-American sportspeople